Vanguard Films, Inc. was an American film production company, established by producer David O. Selznick in 1943, after the dissolution of Selznick International Pictures. The company's president was Daniel T. O'Shea; Dore Schary was the head of production. The company was liquidated in 1951.

History
After the dissolution of Selznick International Pictures, David O. Selznick established Vanguard Films, Inc., in 1943 and Selznick Releasing Organization in 1946. Vanguard was created to continue his productions, while the Selznick Releasing Organization was made to distribute output by Vanguard. Previously, Vanguard released through United Artists, of which Vanguard owned one-third of its stock. As with Selznick International, Vanguard was located at the RKO studio.

Vanguard Films took over the three films still in production—Since You Went Away, I'll Be Seeing You and Hitchcock's Spellbound—and delivered them to the distributor United Artists, thus fulfilling Selznick's contract with UA.

After the agreement with United Artists was completed, Vanguard films were distributed by RKO Radio Pictures or Selznick Releasing Organization. Notable films among those are Hitchcock's The Paradine Case and King Vidor's Duel in the Sun.

Vanguard Films was dissolved in 1951.

Filmography

Library
Like most Selznick productions, films made by Vanguard are now owned by The Walt Disney Company through ABC.

See also
 Selznick International Pictures
 David O. Selznick filmography

References

External links
Hollywood Renegades: David O. Selznick: The SIMPP Years Linked 2014-02-23
Hollywood Renegades: Dore Schary's account in his autobiography of how he joined Vanguard Films Linked 2014-02-23

Film production companies of the United States
American companies disestablished in 1951
Mass media companies disestablished in 1951
American companies established in 1943
Mass media companies established in 1943